The 60th Pennsylvania House of Representatives District is located in western Pennsylvania has been represented by Abby Major since 2021.

District Profile 
The 60th District is located in Armstrong County and Westmoreland County and includes the following areas:

Armstrong County

Apollo
 Applewold
 Bethel Township
 Burrell Township
 Cadogan Township
 East Franklin Township
 Ford City
 Ford Cliff
 Freeport
 Gilpin Township
 Kiskiminetas Township
Leechburg
 Manor Township
 Manorville
 North Apollo
North Buffalo Township
Parks Township
 South Bend Township
 South Buffalo Township
 West Kittanning

Westmoreland County

Allegheny Township
East Vandergrift
Hyde Park
Lower Burrell (part)
Ward 01 
Ward 02 
Ward 03 
Ward 04 (part)
Division 02
Vandergrift
West Leechburg

Representatives

Recent election results

References

External links 

District map from the United States Census Bureau
 Pennsylvania House Legislative District Maps from the Pennsylvania Redistricting Commission.
 Population Data for District 60 from the Pennsylvania Redistricting Commission.

Government of Armstrong County, Pennsylvania
Government of Butler County, Pennsylvania
Government of Indiana County, Pennsylvania
60